Hüdai Ülker  (born 1951, Štip) is an ethnically Turkish German writer who was born in Yugoslavia.

Life
He studied mechanical sciences in Izmir, and later at the universities of Berlin and Anatolia. Since 1985, he's the Berlin's member of the Verband deutscher Schriftsteller (VS)

Works
Gurbet insanları, Izmir : Sanat-Koop Yayınları, 1983.  
Belgrad liegt hinter diesem Berg, Erzählungen 1985 
Meyhane. Zwei Erzählungen; Express Edition Berlin, 1986
Annelieses Aufstand, Erzählungen 1988 
Ruhlar krali, Izmir : Anadolu Matbaacilik, 1996

Prizes 
Literaturpreis der Volkshochschule Tiergarten/Kreuzberg, Berlin 1982 
Literaturpreis für Siemens-Mitarbeiter, Berlin 1988

External links 
Autorenhomepage von Hüdai Ülker 

1951 births
Living people
German male writers